223rd may refer to:

223rd Battalion (Canadian Scandinavians), CEF, a unit in the Canadian Expeditionary Force during the First World War
223rd Brigade (United Kingdom), a Home Defence formation of the British Army during the First World War
223rd Independent Infantry Brigade (Home), a Home Defence formation of the British Army during the Second World War
223rd Military Intelligence Battalion (United States) provides interpreters, translators, counter-intelligence, interrogation and signals intelligence support
223rd Mixed Brigade (Spain), a unit of the Spanish Republican Army in the Spanish Civil War

See also
223 (number)
223, the year 223 (CCXXIII) of the Julian calendar
223 BC